Letha Manasulu is a 2004 Indian Telugu-language romantic drama film directed by S. V. Krishna Reddy. The film is produced by V. Balasouri and M. Anantha Varma under Sri Sivasai Pictures. It is a remake of the Tamil film Azhagi (2002) and stars Srikanth, Kalyani, and Gopika. Raju (Srikanth) and Dhana Lakshmi (Kalyani) are childhood sweethearts who eventually get married to others. When Dhana Lakshmi loses her husband, Raju pities and takes her in as a maidservant while keeping his wife Bhanu (Gopika) in the dark about their past.

The film's score and soundtrack is composed by M. M. Keeravani. Letha Manasulu released on 1 October 2004.

Plot

Cast 
 Srikanth as Raju
 Kalyani as Dhana Lakshmi
 Gopika as Bhanu
 Raghunatha Reddy as Bhanu's father
 AVS
 S. S. Kanchi
 Sivaji Raja as Raju's friend
 Siva Parvathy as Bhanu's mother
 Draksharamam Saroja
 Rajeswari
 Banda Jyothi
 Krishna Chaitanya
 Narsing Yadav
 Baby Sruthi
 Master Manoj
 Kavya

Soundtrack 
The soundtrack album consists of six singles composed by M. M. Keeravani. The audio launch was attended by Y. S. Rajasekhara Reddy, then chief minister of Andhra Pradesh. Reviewing the soundtrack album, The Hindu stated: "All the songs in the film are made rich by sensible and poetic lyrics [..] However, the singers' good rendition notwithstanding, the pronunciation by the non-Telugu artistes remains much to be desired as usual".

Reception 
Reviewing the film for The Hindu, Gudipoodi Srihari wrote: "Though neat and simple, there is nothing novel in the storyline which is akin to the narration in a novel. It is surprising to note that a popular director known for neat themes, Krishna Reddy chose a routine theme involving a man and two women." A critic from Sify termed it "Slow and dreary," and stated, "Music of Keeravani is very average and dialogues by Ramana Chintapally are adequate. On the whole is film is slow with no surprises or commercial elements." Griddaluru Gopalrao of Zamin Ryot criticised the direction and screenplay, writing that the director failed to bring any novelty to the old storyline. He added that the characterisation was poor and performances were mediocre.

References

External links 

 

2000s Telugu-language films
2004 romantic drama films
Films directed by S. V. Krishna Reddy
Films scored by M. M. Keeravani
Indian romantic drama films
Telugu remakes of Tamil films